Ryszard Filipski (17 July 1934 – 22 October 2021) was a Polish actor and theatre and film director. 

He established the monodrama theatre   in Kraków (1966–1981). Ryszard Filipski is known for Hubal (1973), Zamach stanu (1981) and many other films. In 2003 he starred in the film An Ancient Tale: When the Sun Was a God under Jerzy Hoffman.

Awards and honours
Filipski has received many awards, including:
Knight's Cross of the Order of Polonia Restituta (1978)
Gold Cross of Merit (1974)
Bronze Badge of Janek Krasicki (1970)
Gold Badge of Janek Krasicki (1976)
Badge of Merit in Culture (1974)
Gold Badge "for his contribution to Kraków"(1975)

References

External links
  
 Ryszard Filipski at the www.filmpolski.pl 

1934 births
2021 deaths
Male actors from Kraków
Polish male stage actors
Polish film directors
Polish male film actors
Actors from Lviv
Knights of the Order of Polonia Restituta
Recipients of the Gold Cross of Merit (Poland)
Film people from Lviv
Recipient of the Meritorious Activist of Culture badge